Zhivopisnoe obozrenie (Pictorial Review) was a Russian illustrated weekly magazine published in Saint Petersburg in 1872–1900 and in 1902–1905.

The first issue of Zhivopisnoe obozrenie stran sveta (Foreign lands' pictorial review), as it was originally called, came out on 15 December 1872, edited by the cartographer scholar Nikita Zuev. As D.A. Karch-Karchevsky took over in 1875, the publication's title was shortened and it now featured literary section. In the years to follow the magazine's editors were Nikolai Shulgin (1880-1882), Pyotr Polevoy (1882-1885), Sergey  Dobrodeyev (1885-1900), Pyotr Bykov, A.P. Nestor and Ignaty Potapenko (1902-1905).

The original Review, subtitled "Illustrated journal of travelling, expeditions, et cetera," featured mostly (translated, as well as original) articles on popular ethnography and geography, while focusing on high quality illustrations. In 1875 it cut the natural sciences section to a minimum and became just 'Illustrated journal' with emphasis now on literature and poetry, featuring essays on serious art (Viktor Vasnetsov, Konstantin Makovsky, Ilya Repin, among others).

Among the authors whose works appeared regularly in the magazine  were Alexander Sheller-Mikhaylov, Yakov Polonsky, Konstantin Fofanov, Konstantin Balmont, Dmitry Mamin-Sibiryak, Vasily Nemirovich-Danchenko, Ignaty Potapenko and Fyodor Sologub. Several translations of prominent foreign authors (Alphonse Daudet, Bret Harte, Anatole France among others) appeared in Zhivopisnoe obozrenie for the first time.

References

1872 establishments in the Russian Empire
1905 disestablishments in the Russian Empire
Defunct literary magazines published in Europe
Defunct magazines published in Russia
Magazines established in 1872
Magazines disestablished in 1905
Magazines published in Saint Petersburg
Russian-language magazines
Literary magazines published in Russia
Weekly magazines published in Russia